Women in Management, Business and Public Service (WIMBIZ) is a Nigerian non-profit organization that seeks to empower women.

History

The establishment of WIMBIZ was conceptualized by Chichi Okonjo, the only man among the founding members of the organization. It was co-founded in 2001 by Yewande Zaccheaus, Morin Desalu and Omobola Johnson, the former minister of communication.

The formation of this organisation started when Chichi attended a women's conference in the Republic of South Africa. He felt the same idea should be replicated at home. He briefed Omobola Johnson on his arrival in the country. Omobola informed Yewande Zaccheaus and Morin Desalu. The pair mobilised other members that became the founding members of the organisation.

List of Founders 

 Adebola Adesola
Ibukun Awosika
Adeola Azeez
 Mairo Bashir
Morin Desalu
Omobola Johnson
 Ifeoma Idigbe
Ifeyinwa Ighodalo
Chichi Okonjo
 Julia Oku Jacks
 Toyin Olawoye
Funmi Roberts
 Yewande Zaccheaus

Annual conferences and lectures

WIMBIZ started her annual conference in 2003. Each conference is tagged with a theme and is purposed to reflect the overall mission and vision of the organisation and how to move it forward. The 13th and 14th editions of the annual conference were held  at Eko Hotels and Suites, Victoria Island, Lagos. The event marking the 13th edition was tagged "Nigeria Rising....Accelerating Transformation".

The 14th edition was tagged "Leadership… Step Up and Stand Out!". According to The Guardian Newspaper, the Chairperson of the organisation Osayi Alile at a meeting that kicked off the conference in 2015 said "every woman must know how to manage her personal finance. One of the key challenges with women in politics for example is that most women are unable to finance their political careers. This is true in other aspects of life. How can women build their financial strength? How does the ability to grow finances impact women’s leadership? This conference will draw on personal experiences of the panelists in building a strong case for women to mind their personal finances".

In the same vein, the Guardian Newspaper also reported that Maiden Alex Ibru, the chairperson of the Guardian Newspaper, at the event saying "This organisation is the epitome of hope, not only to the young ones, but also to generation yet unborn. You have acquired great reputation of seeking to foster excellence among women executive in business and government in particular and other areas of human endeavour. I therefore, consider it a privileged to be asked to chair this conference,". She advised women to be well equipped in order to be able to take advantage of the opportunities beckoning at them as the ladder for reaching the top. Though, she agreed that we are in the men's world but women can still hold their ways if they are better prepared through proper education and training. Some of the high points at the event include breakout session held by Mrs Wendy Luhabe, from the Republic of South Africa and the presentation of awards to distinguished members such as former Vice Chancellor of University of Benin, Prof. Mrs. Grace Alele-Williams and former Vice Chancellor of Afe Babalola University, Prof. Sidi Osho.

Aside the annual conference, the organisation also holds annual lectures which parade speakers from all works of life to speak to women on how they can grow to achieve their objectives in life. In 2015 the body held her annual lecture at Muson Centre, Lagos Nigeria. At the event the President Council Stock Exchange in Nigeria, Mr. Aigboje Aig-Imoukhuede, said "Tough times are not uniquely Nigeria’s; you will always face challenges in the quest to succeed regardless of your nationalities and gender, you will always face challenges. Other people may not face the same type of challenges as us, but let’s not think that other people are not exempt from tough times."

References

External links
 Official Website
Conference Website

Non-profit organizations based in Nigeria
Non-profit organizations based in Lagos
Women in Lagos
2001 establishments in Nigeria
Organizations established in 2001
Women's organizations based in Nigeria